Muyange is a city in northwest Burundi.

References
Fitzpatrick, M., Parkinson, T., & Ray, N. (2006) East Africa. Footscray, VIC: Lonely Planet.

Populated places in Burundi
Bubanza Province